The Rural Municipality of Grant No. 372 is a rural municipality (RM) in the Canadian province of Saskatchewan within Census Division No. 15 and  Division No. 5. The RM's office is located in Vonda.

History 
The RM of Grant No. 372 incorporated as a rural municipality on December 13, 1909.

Heritage properties
There are four designated heritage buildings located within the RM. These properties include:
Holy Trinity Ukrainian Greek Orthodox Church - Constructed in 1924, the church was built by Theodore Yanow and continues to be used as a church.
Robert and Adele Schmidt's Double Hip Red Barn - Constructed in 1917.
Ss. Peter and Paul Ukrainian Catholic Church (Bodnari Church) -  Constructed in 1936, eight kilometers east from the Village of Smuts, the church was constructed by immigrants from the Borschiv region of Ukraine.
St. John the Baptist Ukrainian Greek Catholic Church - Constructed near Smuts in 1926, the church was constructed by immigrants from the Borshchiv and Morodenka regions of Ukraine.

Geography

Communities and localities 
The following urban municipalities are surrounded by the RM.

Towns
 Vonda

The following unincorporated communities are within the RM.

Localities
 St. Denis
 Smuts

Demographics 

Government 
The RM of Grant No. 372 is governed by an elected municipal council and an appointed administrator that meets on the third Tuesday of every month. The reeve of the RM is Travis Hryniuk while its administrator is Brenda Skakun. The RM's office is located in Vonda.

References 

G

Division No. 15, Saskatchewan